Charles John Holt may refer to:

 Jack Holt (actor)
 Tim Holt, his actor grandson